is considered a founder of the discipline of Japanese primatology. He was an internationally renowned anthropologist and served as a professor emeritus at Kyoto University and president of the Primate Society of Japan. He died at age 75 of pneumonia. As with most Japanese primatologists, his early research was on Japanese macaques (Macaca fuscata), but most of his career focused on African primates, especially chimpanzees (Pan troglodytes). He started research in Africa in 1958. The majority of his work was based around the social structures of primate society.

Itani graduated in 1951 from Kyoto University, and became professor in the Faculty of Science in 1981. He founded the university's Primate Research Institute and the Center for African Area Studies. He also served as professor at Kobe Gakuin University. In 1984, he received the Huxley Award in Anthropology from the Royal Anthropological Institute in London.

Books available in English
 Japanese Monkeys in Takasakiyama (1954)
 Hominid culture in primate perspective / Duane Quiatt and Junichiro Itani, editors (1994)
 A Comparative study of ecological anthropology in tropical Africa 
 Great Ape Societies by William C McGrew; Linda F Marchant; Toshisada Nishida; Jane Goodall and Junichiro Itani

References

1926 births
2001 deaths
20th-century Japanese zoologists
Primatologists
Japanese mammalogists
Academic staff of Kyoto University
Kyoto University alumni
Recipients of the Medal with Purple Ribbon